The Mixed 50 metre rifle three positions event was a shooting sports event held as part of the Shooting at the 1976 Summer Olympics programme. It was the seventh appearance of the event. The competition was held on 21 July 1976 at the shooting ranges in Montreal. 57 shooters from 34 nations competed.

Lanny Bassham and Margaret Murdock tied for the first place, but Murdock was placed second after review of the targets. Bassham suggested that two gold medals be given, and after this request was declined, asked Murdock to share the top step with him at the award ceremony. Women had no separate shooting events at the time and were allowed to compete with men. Murdock became the first woman to win an Olympic medal in shooting.

Results

References

Shooting at the 1976 Summer Olympics
Men's 050m 3 positions 1976